James Edward Pike (4 September 1892 − 7 October 1969) nicknamed "The Master", was an Australian jockey who was known for riding Phar Lap to victory in the 1930 Melbourne Cup.

Pike was born on 4 September 1892 in Newcastle, New South Wales, eldest child of Charles Pike and Jane Isabella Liddell. He started his career as a  jockey in 1907. He went to England the following year and competed in 17 races, winning 2 and 5 placings. Returning to Australia he won his first major race at 18 in the Victoria Derby in 1910 with Beverage.

Pike died in poverty on 7 October 1969, aged 77, at his home in Bondi.

In 2002, Pike was inducted into the Australian Racing Hall of Fame.

Popular culture
In the 1983 feature film Phar Lap, Pike was played by Australian actor James Steele.

Honours
In 2002, Pike was inducted into the Australian Racing Hall of Fame.

Image gallery

References

Australian jockeys
1892 births
1969 deaths
Australian Thoroughbred Racing Hall of Fame inductees
Sportspeople from Newcastle, New South Wales
Sport Australia Hall of Fame inductees
Sportsmen from New South Wales
20th-century Australian people